The Shroud of the Thwacker is a 2005 novel written by American author Chris Elliott and published by the Miramax Books in the United States.

See also
Boilerplate (robot), a character featured in the novel

2005 American novels
Books by Chris Elliott